Kargoszyn  is a village within the administrative district of Gmina Ciechanów, in Ciechanów County, Masovian Voivodeship, Poland. In 1975-1998 village belonged to Ciechanów Voivodeship.

References

Kargoszyn